Berentin Rural District is a rural district (dehestan) in the Bikah District of Rudan County, Hormozgan Province, Iran. At the 2006 census, its population was 8,328, in 1,700 families.  The rural district has 10 villages.

References 

Rural Districts of Hormozgan Province
Rudan County